The New Adventures of Speed Racer is a 1993 update of the Speed Racer animated series. This new Americanized version was designed as a single 13-episode season (the first episode was entitled “The Mach 5’s First Trial”), with the intent of launching a feature film adaptation.

Issues with Warner Bros. having the live action rights (which resulted in the 2008 release) forestalled negotiations and investments for the film and the series ended accordingly, though it did provide a massive merchandising reboot for the intellectual property, which found a resurgence thanks to a major toy line. The series concept was born out of a pitch from PANGEA to then property-owners, John and James Rocknowski of Speed Racer Enterprises, Inc. Fred Wolf of Fred Wolf Films, had also pitched the notion of rebooting the franchise. PANGEA, having worked developmentally with Playmates Toys in association with Fred Wolf Films on the Teenage Mutant Ninja Turtles, worked with Speed Racer Enterprises on the series development, including the merchandising, which included a toy line from Ace Novelty Toys, comic books by NOW Comics, and novelties by NJ Croce.  The series also proved to be popular with the Russian audience. A new theme song was written.

The “New Adventures” part of the title comes from official documents used for TV listings. The show itself is referred to onscreen as simply “Speed Racer.” Coincidentally, Speed Racer X is known in Brazil as “As Novas Aventuras de Speed Racer,” which literally translates into “The New Adventures of Speed Racer.”

Cast
Michael Gough as Speed Racer, Foreman
Thom Pinto as Sparky, Racer X
Jeannie Elias as Trixie, Spritle, Chim-Chim
Tony Pope as Pops Racer
Jim Cummings as Caligula Y. Barnum

Episodes

References

External links
 

Speed Racer
1993 Japanese television series debuts
1993 Japanese television series endings
1990s American animated television series
1993 American television series debuts
1993 American television series endings
American children's animated action television series
American children's animated adventure television series
American children's animated sports television series
Japanese children's animated action television series
Japanese children's animated adventure television series
Japanese children's animated sports television series
American television series based on Japanese television series
Television series by CBS Studios
English-language television shows
Anime-influenced Western animated television series
Animated television series about auto racing
Animated television series reboots